Phytocoris ulmi is a species of plant bugs belonging to the family Miridae, subfamily Mirinae.

Description
Its 1st antennal segment is thin with the hairs being long.

Distribution
Europe but it is mainly absent from Azores, Canary Islands, Cyprus, Faroe Islands, Greece, Iceland, Italy, Liechtenstein, Madeira, Malta, Portugal, and central part of Russia. To the east it extends to the Caucasus.

Ecology
Phytocoris ulmi found in hedgerows and woods especially on hawthorn.

References

External links
Phytocoris ulmi

Bugs described in 1758
Taxa named by Carl Linnaeus
Hemiptera of Europe
Phytocoris